Arcella hemisphaerica is an amoeboid species.

References

Tubulinea
Species described in 1852